All four or All fours may refer to:

 All fours (human position)
 All Fours (card game), 17th-century game still played today that gave rise to the All Fours family
 A concept in commanding precedent
 All Fours (album), by Bosse-de-Nage 
 On All Fours, album